Semmes may refer to:

Semmes (surname), a surname
Semmes, Alabama, a community in southwest Alabama
, more than one United States Navy ship